State Road 267 (SR 267) is a north–south state route in the eastern Florida panhandle, west of Tallahassee.

The route begins at U.S. Route 98 (US 98) in Newport and heads northwest as it crosses SR 363, passes Wakulla Springs, crosses US 319, and continues through the Apalachicola National Forest. It briefly joins with SR 20 to cross the Ochlockonee River, then splits to continue northward to Interstate 10 (I-10), US 90 in Quincy, and the Georgia state line, where it continues as State Route 302.

Major intersections

County Road 267A

County Road 267A is the only suffixed alternate of SR 267. The road is named Spooner Road and can be found south of Quincy. It begins south of the interchange with I-10 and runs southeast to County Road 65B (Old Federal Highway).

References

External links

Florida Route Log (SR 267)
FDOT Maps of Wakulla, Leon, Liberty, and Gadsden Counties (including SR 267)
Big Bend Scenic Byway (Florida Scenic Highways)

267
267
267
267
267